Mingo is the name of a Native American tribe and the tribe's language.

Mingo may also refer to:

Place names
In the United States:
Mingo, Iowa
Mingo, Kansas
Mingo, Mississippi
Mingo, Missouri
Mingo, Ohio
Mingo County, West Virginia
Mingo, North Carolina in Sampson County, North Carolina
Mingo, West Virginia in Randolph County, West Virginia
Black Mingo Creek, a creek in South Carolina
Mingo Junction, Ohio
Mingo National Wildlife Refuge, Missouri
Mingo Wilderness, Missouri, in the Mingo National Wildlife Refuge
Mingo Run, a stream in West Virginia
Mingo Creek (disambiguation)

Other uses
Mingo (footballer) (born 1977), Spanish footballer
Barkevious Mingo, a professional gridiron football player
Jonathan Mingo (born 2001), American football player
Norman Mingo, artist best known for his association with MAD Magazine
USS Mingo, the name of two ships in the United States Navy
Mingo Oak, until 1934, considered the largest and oldest white oak in the U.S., formerly in West Virginia
Mingo snapper, another name for the Vermilion Snapper (Rhomboplites aurorubens), a fish of the Caribbean with rough leathery skin
Mingo, a city in the Flash Gordon comic strip
Mingo, a character in the television series Daniel Boone, played by actor Ed Ames
Mingo, a character in the 1935 opera Porgy and Bess